Alejandro Antonio Maureira Cueto (born 26 July 1983) is a Chilean former footballer.

Playing career
He played for Curicó Unido.

Coaching career
From 2017 he worked for Curicó Unido (women) at both senior and under-17 levels. He also was in charge of coaching the men's under-21 team.

References

External links
 
 

1983 births
Living people
Sportspeople from Viña del Mar
Chilean footballers
Chilean expatriate footballers
C.D. Arturo Fernández Vial footballers
San Marcos de Arica footballers
Ñublense footballers
Deportivo Zacapa players
Lota Schwager footballers
Deportes Concepción (Chile) footballers
Curicó Unido footballers
Everton de Viña del Mar footballers
Santiago Morning footballers
Deportes Magallanes footballers
Magallanes footballers
Primera B de Chile players
Chilean Primera División players
Liga Nacional de Fútbol de Guatemala players
Chilean expatriate sportspeople in Guatemala
Expatriate footballers in Guatemala
Association football midfielders
Chilean football managers